Events in the year 2005 in Cyprus.

Incumbents 

 President: Demetris Christofias
 President of the Parliament: Yiannakis Omirou

Events 
Ongoing – Cyprus dispute

 14 August – Helios Airways Flight 522 en route from Larnaca via Athens to Prague crashes near Athens, killing at least 121 who were on board. Observations from Greek fighter aircraft indicate a decompression problem.

Deaths

References 

 
2000s in Cyprus
Years of the 21st century in Cyprus
Cyprus
Cyprus
Cyprus